Albert Denison Denison, 1st Baron Londesborough, KCH, FRS, FSA (21 October 1805 – 15 January 1860) was a British Whig Party politician and diplomat, known as Lord Albert Conyngham from 1816 to 1849.

Early life and career
Born Albert Denison Conyngham, he was the third son of Henry Conyngham, 1st Marquess Conyngham and Elizabeth Denison. He was educated at Eton, and was commissioned a cornet and sub-lieutenant in the Royal Horse Guards, in 1821, before joining the diplomatic service. On 28 April 1826, he purchased an unattached infantry lieutenancy. In 1824, he was an Attaché to Berlin, then Vienna in 1825, and Secretary of the Legation to Florence in 1828, and to Berlin, from 1829 to 1831.

Conyngham was knighted in 1829, and at the 1835 general election he was elected as Whig Member of Parliament for Canterbury, a seat he held until 1841, when he did not contest the election. He was elected unopposed at a by-election in March 1847 and held the seat until he was elevated to peerage in 1850. From 1844 to 1845, he served as first President of the British Archaeological Association, and from 1855 until his death as first President of the London and Middlesex Archaeological Society. He was sometime Vice-Admiral of the Yorkshire Coast.

In 1849, he changed his surname to Denison under the terms of the will of his maternal uncle, William Joseph Denison and was created Baron Londesborough a year later. In 1851, he bought both Grimston Park, near Tadcaster, North Yorkshire and the painting The Monarch of the Glen, the latter for £840.

Family
On 6 July 1833, Londesborough had married Henrietta Weld-Forester (a daughter of the 1st Baron Forester) and they had six children:

William Henry Forester (1834–1900)
Albert Denison Somerville (1835–1903)
Henrietta Elizabeth Sophia (d. 1924), married Sir Philip Grey Egerton, 11th Baronet, and had issue.
Selina Camerina Charlotte (d. 1852)
Isabella Maria (d. 1856)
Augusta Elizabeth (d. 1887), married Arthur Wrottesley, 3rd Baron Wrottesley, and had issue.

Londesborough's first wife died in 1841, and on 21 December 1847, he married Ursula Bridgeman (a daughter of Vice-Admiral Charles Orlando Bridgeman) and they also had six children:

Ursula Elizabeth (1848–1880)
Henry Charles (1849–1936)
Conyngham Albert (1851–1938)
Albertina Agnes Mary (1854–1929), who married Colonel Ivor Herbert, 1st Baron Treowen, in 1873. She founded and was the first President of the Ottawa Decorative Art Society. She was president of the Woman's Humane Society, and the first president of the Humane Society of Ottawa. She also had cabmen's shelters erected in Ottawa.
Harold Albert (1856–1949)
Evelyn Albert (1859–1883; after an argument with his father-in-law, Evelyn emigrated, first to Belgium in 1878, then to the United States, where he died from consumption)

Death
Lord Londesborough died in 1860 and his title was inherited by his eldest son, William, who was later created Earl of Londesborough in 1887. His second wife later married Lord Otho FitzGerald.

Sources
Burke's Peerage

References

External links 

|-

Londesborough, Albert Denison, 1st Baron
Londesborough, Albert Denison, 1st Baron
Whig (British political party) MPs for English constituencies
Londesborough, Albert Denison, 1st Baron
Londesborough, Albert Denison, 1st Baron
Presidents of the Royal Numismatic Society
Londesborough, Albert Denison, 1st Baron
Londesborough, Albert Denison, 1st Baron
Younger sons of marquesses
Londesborough, Albert Denison, 1st Baron
Londesborough, Albert Denison, 1st Baron
UK MPs 1835–1837
UK MPs 1837–1841
UK MPs 1847–1852
UK MPs who were granted peerages
Albert
Peers of the United Kingdom created by Queen Victoria
Presidents of the Royal Archaeological Institute